The White Springs Historic District  is a historic district in White Springs, Florida. It is bounded by River Street, 1st Street, Suwannee Street,  Hewitt Street, SR 25A, U.S. 41 and Suwannee Road, encompasses approximately 1,200 acres (4.9 km2), and contains 81 historic buildings and 1 object. The district was added to the U.S. National Register of Historic Places on September 19, 1997.

References

External links
Hamilton County listings, Florida's Office of Cultural and Historical Programs

Geography of Hamilton County, Florida
Historic districts on the National Register of Historic Places in Florida
Historic American Buildings Survey in Florida
National Register of Historic Places in Hamilton County, Florida